Assyrian politics in Iraq have been taking many different turns since the US invasion of Iraq in 2003. Today, there are many different Assyrian political parties in Iraq. The main Assyrian party that came out from the 2005 elections was the Assyrian Democratic Movement. However, Sarkis Aghajan began to challenge its power beginning in 2006 with the opening of Ishtar TV and the KDP-affiliated Chaldean Syriac Assyrian Popular Council.

1992 Kurdistan Region parliamentary election

On May 19, 1992, elections were held for the Kurdistan National Assembly (KNA,) the parliament of the Kurdistan Region in Iraq. At the time, the National Assembly had 105 seats. The parties representing the Assyrian community competed in a closed list guaranteeing that there would be five Assyrian seats in the KNA.
There were four Assyrian lists in the elections:
Assyrian Democratic Movement
Kurdistan Christian Unity of Sarkis Aghajan
Democratic Christians
Chaldo-Ashur Communist Party

Results

A minimum of 2,400 votes was required to win a seat. ADM won four seats and one was won by the Kurdistan Christian Unity.
The names of those elected into the parliament:
Yonadam Kanna (ADM)
Shamil Benyamin (ADM)
Francis Yousif Shaba † (ADM)
Akram Ashur Odisho (ADM)
Sarkis Aghajan (KCU)

Francis Youif was assassinated on June 1, 1993, in Dohuk.

Iraqi parliamentary election, January 2005
Iraqi parliamentary election, January 2005
A general election was held on 30 January 2005 to elect a temporary 275-member Council of Representatives of Iraq. It was the first time in the history of Iraq (outside of KRG-areas) that Assyrian political parties had been allowed to be part of the electoral system. In the elections, there were three different Assyrian lists;
National Rafidain List (204) - Yonadam Kanna
Assyrian Democratic Movement
Assyrian National Assembly (139)
Assyrian National Congress
Assyrian Bet-Nahrain Democratic Party of Sargon Dadesho
Bet-Nahrain Democratic Coalition (148)
Beth Nahren Patriotic Union
Syriac Independent Gathering Movement

Chaldean National Congress was initially part of list 204, but ended up dropping off before the election. Chaldean Democratic Union Party (CDUP), Assyrian Patriotic Party (APP) and Bet Nahrain Democratic Party (BNDP) of Romeo Hakkari joined the Kurdistani list (130).

In all, six Assyrians were elected to the parliament. National Rafidain list got the minimum required votes for a seat in the parliament and it was given to Yonadam Kanna (ADM.) Other Assyrians that were elected into the parliament include Goriel Mineso Khamis (BNDP), Nuri Potrus 'Atto, Ablahad Afraim Sawa (CDUP) and Jacklin Qosin Zomaya (APP) all under the Kurdistani list (130.) Wijdan Michael was elected under Iyad Allawi's secular list.

Iraq Governorate elections, 2005

On the same day, Iraq held a local governorate elections in all 18 governorates. Assyrian political parties participitated in 4 of the 18 local governorate elections. The only Assyrian party that won a seat in any governorate was the Assyrian Democratic Movement in the Nineveh Governorate. The party received 4,650 votes and captured one seat (out of 41.)

In addition, Salvana Boya of the Assyrian Patriotic Party was elected in the Kirkuk Governorate council under the Kurdistani list.

2005 Kurdistan Region parliamentary election

Elections for the Kurdistan National Assembly, the parliament of the Kurdistan Region of Iraq, were held on 30 January 2005, to coincide with the Iraqi legislative election and governoral council elections. All Assyrian-based parties joined the Democratic Patriotic Alliance of Kurdistan. The coalition won 104 of the 111 seats in the parliament, of which 5 were won by Assyrians:
(in order as they were in the coalition list)
Jamal Shamon Yalya (CCS) - 69
Romeo Hakkari (BNDP) - 71
Bayzar Milko Rohan (CDUP) - 72
Andreaus Youkhana Georgis (ADM) - 73
Galawesh Shaba Hojji (ADM) - 76

Iraqi parliamentary election, 2005 (December)

A general election was held on 15 December 2005 to elect a permanent 275-member Iraqi Council of Representatives. The elections took place under a list system, whereby voters chose from a list of parties. In the elections, there were three main Assyrian list:
National Rafidain List (740) - had only one party, the Assyrian Democratic Movement.
Patriotic Beth Nahrain (Al-Nahrain National) (752)
Beth Nahren Patriotic Union
Chaldean National Congress
Assyrian Patriotic Party
Syriac Independent Gathering Movement
Chaldean Democratic Forum
Hikmat Hakim (Independent)
Assyrian General Conference (800)

Other Assyrian parties decided to side with non-Assyrian based list. The Chaldean Democratic Union Party decided to run under the Kurdish list (730.) The Iraqi Christian Democratic Party of Minas al-Yousifi joined the list of the Iraqi National Dialogue Front (667.) Bet Nahrain Democratic Party of Romeo Hakkari withdrew.

In all, three Assyrians were voted into the parliament. ADM succeeded in capturing one parliament seat in the Baghdad governorate, which was given to the secretary of its party, Yonadam Kanna. Fawzi Hariri (KDP) and Ablahad Afraim Sawa (CDUP) under the Kurdistani list (730) for the Arbil governorate were voted in as well.

Iraqi Governorate elections 2009

A local governorate election was held on January 31, 2009, in Iraq. There were no elections in the heavily-Assyrian populated north governorate of Dohuk and Arbil (including Slemani and Kirkuk.) 440 seats in 14 (of the 18) Iraqi governorates were up for grabs.

In the last local governorate elections, only one seat (in Nineveh) was won by Assyrians (ADM.) Unlike the 2005 local elections, minority groups had reserved seats ahead of the election. Three seats were reserved for Assyrians; one each in the governorates of Nineveh, Baghdad and Basra.

In the election, there were three main Assyrian blocks fighting for votes. The Assyrian Democratic Movement being one, under the list titled National Rafidain List (504).  The other being a Kurdistan Democratic Party-backed block titled the Ishtar Patriotic List (513).

The Ishtar Patriotic List included the following:
Chaldean Syriac Assyrian Popular Council
Bet Nahrain Democratic Party
Chaldean Democratic Forum
Chaldean Cultural Society
Beth Nahren Patriotic Union
Syriac Independent Gathering Movement

The third major list was the Chaldean Democratic Union Party (503).

The Nineveh seat was won by Saad Tanios Jaji of SIGM. The Baghdad seat was won by Gewargis Isho Sada of the BNDP. The Ishtar Patriotic List decided not to run in the Basra elections, however, it supported the Chaldean National Congress (CNC.) The Basra seat was won by Saad Matti Boutros of the CDUP.

2009 Kurdistan Region parliamentary election

Kurdistan Region held elections to elect its 111-member Kurdistan National Assembly on 25 July 2009. Five seats are reserved for Assyrians. There were 8 Assyrian parties that initially signed up to participate in the elections. Prior to the elections, BNDP decided to withdraw. APP and KACP decided to run on a joint list. CDUP and CNC merged in a joint list as well.

Chaldean Syriac Assyrian Popular Council List (68)
 Chaldean Syriac Assyrian Popular Council
National Rafidain List (67)
Assyrian Democratic Movement
Self government List (65)
Assyrian Patriotic Party
Chaldo-Ashur Communist Party
Chaldean United List (64)
Chaldean Democratic Union Party
Chaldean Democratic Forum

The elected politicians:
 Thair Abdalahad Ogostin (CSAPC)
 Susan Yousif Khoshaba (CSAPC)
 Amir Goga Yousif (CSAPC)
 Salem Toma Kako (ADM)
 Jihan Ismael Benyamin (ADM)

Iraqi parliamentary election, 2010

A parliamentary election was held on 7 March 2010. The parliament previously approved to increase the number of seats from 275 to 325, of which 5 seats were reserved for Assyrians. The reserved seats for Assyrian in Iraqi parliament was the first in the country's history. Going into the elections, four Christians were in the parliament: Yonadam Kanna (ADM), Fawzi Hariri (KDP,) Ablahad Afraim Sawa (CDUP,) and Wijdan Michael (Allawi list.)

The Assyrian Patriotic Party, Chaldean Democratic Forum, and the Bet Nahrain Democratic Party announced on November 15, that they would create an alliance.

Five major lists have been created for the election;

 389 - National Rafidain List: Assyrian Democratic Movement
 390 - Chaldean Syriac Assyrian Popular Council list
 391 - Chaldean National Congress
 392 - Chaldean Democratic Union Party
 393 - Independent Sarkis Yousif
 394 - Ishtar Democratic List: Assyrian Patriotic Party. Beth Nahrain, Chaldean Democratic Forum
 395 - Independent John (Yohanna) Joseph

Three seats were won by the ADM and two seats by the CSAPC. The five elected into the parliament:
 Yonadam Kanna
 Basimah Yusuf Butrus
 Imad Youkhana Yaqo
 Khales Isho Esitefo
 Luis Caro Bandar

Iraqi Governorate elections, 2013
A Governorate (or local) elections were held in Iraq on 20 April 2013, with Nineveh Governorate along with Anbar voting on June 20, due to violence in the city caused by the Islamic State of Iraq. Elections didn't take place in the 3 governorates forming the Kurdistan Region.

As with the previous local elections, 3 seats were reserved for Assyrians, including one each in Baghdad, Nineveh and Basra. The Chaldean Syriac Assyrian Popular Council reclaimed their seats in Nineveh and Baghdad, by receiving 8,635 and 1,513 votes respectively.

2013 Kurdistan Region parliamentary election

Kurdistan Region held elections to elect its 111-member Kurdistan National Assembly on 21 September 2013. 
Each Kurdish party listed 100 candidates while each Assyrian and Turkman party listed 5 candidates. There were 3 Assyrian lists running for the five reserved seats. Prior to the election, some ADM members decided to leave the party and run on their own list called Sons of Mesopotamia.

125 Sons of Mesopotamia List
 List included former individuals from the Assyrian Democratic Movement
126 National Rafidain List
 Assyrian Democratic Movement
127 Chaldean Syriac Assyrian United List
Assyrian Patriotic Party
Bet-Nahrain Democratic Party
Chaldean National Council
Chaldean Syriac Assyrian Popular Council

Results
The elections resulted in the Popular Council losing one seat, while ADM retaining two seats and the new Mesopotamia List being given one seat. 
Yaqoub Gorgis and Lina Azriya Bahram of the ADM were elected along with Srood Maqdasy from the Mesopotamia List. Within the Chaldean Syriac Assyrian United List, the Popular Council managed retain its 2 seats.

Chaldean Syriac Assyrian United List individual votes:

Other Assyrians ran in Kurdish parties, but non were able to get enough votes to win a seat in the parliament. Many voters in Assyrian dominated Areas voted for these parties, including 3,377 votes for the Kurdistan Democratic Party in Ankawa alone.

Iraqi parliamentary elections 2014

Parliamentary elections were held in Iraq on 30 April 2014, electing the 328 members of the Council of Representatives, of which 5 were reserved for the Assyrian minority. 2 of the seats were won by the Assyrian Democratic Movement, 2 by the Chaldean Syriac Assyrian Popular Council, and one by the Iraqi Communist Party who was under the Civil Democratic Alliance.

Azad was replaced Joseph Sylawa. ADM tried but failed to make Sargon Lazar a minister, after Sargon resigned his seat and gave it to Imad Youkhana Yaqo.

Iraqi parliamentary elections 2018

Parliamentary elections will be held in Iraq on 12 May 2018, electing 329 members of the Council of Representatives. A total of 7 different lists will compete for the 5 reserved seats.

See also
Assyrian independence movement
Assyrians in Iraq
Politics of Iraq

References

Sources

 
 
 
 
 
 
 
 
 
 
 
 

Assyrians in Iraq
Politics of Iraq